Known as Matthew Rinaudo (born February 16, 1995), better known as Mizkif, is an American Twitch streamer and YouTuber. He is a founding member and co-owner of gaming organization One True King.

Early life
Rinaudo was born on February 16, 1995, and grew up in Montclair, New Jersey. He graduated from college with a degree in finance.

Career
Rinaudo began streaming in 2016. He streamed to a relatively small community until 2018 when he gained popularity for serving as a cameraman for fellow streamer Paul "Ice Poseidon" Denino.

In May 2019, Rinaudo, along with fellow streamer Esfand, received a seven-day ban from Twitch after the pair made inappropriate comments towards a female streamer at PAX East.

In March 2020, Rinaudo garnered attention after he made over $5,600 during a sleeping stream. In an interview with Wired, he stated, "Most streams can be very draining. This stream was the opposite. It was very easy. It was honestly a nice break from my normal routine of playing games all day."

Rinaudo was the third most watched Twitch streamer during the 2020 United States presidential election, trailing fellow streamers Trainwreckstv and HasanAbi.

On October 11, 2020, Rinaudo, along with fellow Twitch streamers Asmongold, Esfand, Rich Campbell, and Tips Out, announced the launch of their new gaming organization One True King.

Philanthropy
On August 7, 2019, Rinaudo raised over $20,000 for the Make-A-Wish Foundation.

On December 21, 2019, Rinaudo held a charity stream for St. David's Children's Hospital in Austin, Texas. His community raised over $5,000, which Rinaudo would later use to purchase toys for the hospital's patients.

In June 2021, Rinaudo, along with fellow streamer Ryan "Simply" Reeves, rappelled down 600 Congress, a 32-story building in Austin, Texas, for a Make-A-Wish fundraiser event titled "Over the Edge". They raised over $20,000 USD during their companion charity stream, funded by donations from viewers.

Personal life
Rinaudo began dating fellow Twitch streamer and wildlife rehabilitator Maya Higa in 2019. On September 14, 2021, Rinaudo announced on Twitter that he and Higa were no longer in a relationship.

Rinaudo has a heart condition known as viral myocarditis. He has also publicly spoken out about his struggles with attention deficit hyperactivity disorder (ADHD).

Controversies 
On September 19, 2022, Rinaudo was accused by fellow Twitch streamer Trainwreckstv of downplaying and covering up an incident where his roommate and fellow streamer CrazySlick allegedly sexually assaulted female streamer AdrianahLee. Later that day, streamer Ice Poseidon, whom Rinaudo worked with during his early streaming career, published a set of comments made by Rinaudo from 2018 to 2019, characterized as racist and homophobic. The following day, as a result of the aforementioned incidents, Rinaudo was placed on leave by One True King.

On December 31, 2022, One True King released a statement clearing Rinaudo of the allegation of covering up an incident of sexual assault. According to the Texas-based firm Jackson Walker, the investigations counsel did not find direct evidence that Rinaudo attempted to minimize or cover up sexual assault as alleged. His status as an OTK member was reinstated.

Awards and nominations

Notes

References

Living people
Twitch (service) streamers
People from Montclair, New Jersey
People from Austin, Texas
American entertainers
Streamer Award winners
1995 births